Porky's Pimpin' Pee Wee is a 2009 American sex comedy film. It was produced as an ashcan copy in order to retain the legal rights to produce a remake of the film Porky's (1981).

Premise
Three college student friends have misadventures over the summer.

Cast
 Adam Wylie as Edward "Pee Wee" Morris
 John Patrick Jordan as Tommy
 Russ Hunt as Anthony "Meat" Tuperello
 Whitney Anderson as Shelly
 Sandra McCoy as Vanessa
 Cristin Michele as Tina Toppers
 Vic Polizos as "Porky" Wallace
 Barry Livingston as Uncle Howard
 Colleen Camp as Helen Morris

Production
In 1994, a company called Lontano Investments purchased all rights to Porky's. In 2001, Lontano signed a contract with Mola Entertainment, giving the latter the exclusive right to produce a Porky's film in exchange for 1.5% of the budget of the picture, less option fees. The agreement also gave Mola the right to produce another sequel if it satisfied the conditions of its deal, including completing the first picture within five years and paying the purchase fee in whole. This agreement was subsequently amended a number of times, extending the time and increasing the purchase fee from 1.5% of the budget to 2.5%. Mola originally wanted to make a film with a budget of around $10 million but were unable to raise the finance. They decided to make a film in 2009 for under $1 million before its rights expired. It was originally entitled Porky's: The College Years and was later renamed Porky's Pimpin' Pee Wee.

"As time was running out they thought let’s whip up this cheap one and bury it," said Brian Trenchard-Smith, who was hired to direct four weeks before shooting began.

Shooting took place over 15 days on location in Canyon Country, California, and at a studio in Simi Valley, California, starting in October 2008. The director says the film was "designed as an homage to the 80′s sex-comedies where there are raging hormones that cause characters to defy logic and moral scruples in the search for the Holy Grail, which is to get laid. A desperate attempt to get laid." He says his aim was to do an update that did not lose the essence of the original.

Release
The movie was briefly released via video on demand but was not released on DVD. Mola then claimed they had fulfilled their obligations under their contract with Lontano and retained rights to make another sequel. However, Lontano subsequently claimed that the film required a budget of $10 million to satisfy the arrangement. A lawsuit ensued, affecting plans by Howard Stern to make his own remake as Mola maintained it held rights on Porky's until April 1, 2014.

References

External links

2009 films
2000s teen comedy films
2000s English-language films
American teen comedy films
Remakes of American films
2009 comedy films
Films directed by Brian Trenchard-Smith
2000s American films